Lou Wagner (born August 14, 1948) is an American actor. He is probably best known for his regular role as mechanic Harlan Arliss in the NBC television series CHiPs from 1978 to 1983.

In 2015, along with other notable Chips stars, Wagner appeared in a few promos and interviews for MeTVs weekly Chips retro-runs.

Filmography 

 Lost in Space (1967, TV Series) as J-5 Season 3 Episode, "The Haunted Lighthouse".
 Planet of the Apes (1968) as Lucius
 Mayberry R.F.D. (1968, TV Series) as Murphy
 Dragnet 1967 (1968-1969, TV Series) as Caretaker / Andy Raynor / John Dietz / Dennis J. Meldon
 Hello Down There (1969) as Marvin Webster
 Airport (1970) as Schuyler Schultz
 Pufnstuf (1970) 
 The Virginian (1971, TV Series) as Mr. Hill
 Alias Smith and Jones (1971, TV Series) as Butler
 Nichols (1972, TV Series) as McKeever
 Conquest of the Planet of the Apes (1972) as Busboy
 Goodnight, My Love (1972, TV Movie) as Sally
 McMillan & Wife (1973, TV Series) as Willie Marsnak
 Chase (1973, TV Series) as Mouse
 Columbo: Mind Over Mayhem (1974, TV Series) as Ross
 Happy Days (1974, TV Series) as Mr. Schnieber
 Matt Helm (1975, TV Series)
 The UFO Incident (1975, TV Movie) as The Leader
 Mirrors (1978) as Chet
 Quincy, M.E. (1979, TV Series) as Jockey Billy McGinn
 The Baltimore Bullet (1980) as Savannah Shorty
 Gorp (1980) as Federman
 CHiPs (1978–1983, TV Series) as Harlan Arliss
 Crazy Like a Fox (1986, TV Series)
 Hunter (1989, TV Series) as Garth
 The Golden Girls (1992, TV Series) as Larry
 Star Trek: The Next Generation (1992, TV Series) as DaiMon Solok
 Star Trek: Deep Space Nine (1993, TV Series) as Krax
 L.A. Law (1993, TV Series) as Appraiser
 Sodbusters (1994, TV Movie) as Shorty Simms
 Coach (1994, TV Series) as Arthur
 In This Corner (1994) as Referee
 Night Stand with Dick Dietrick (1996, TV Series) as George
 Galgameth (1996) as Zethar
 Sunsplit (1997) as Kurt Pasakivi
 Providence (1999, TV Series) as Weird Job Applicant
 Starry Night (1999) as Gabe Burton
 Yes, Dear (2000-2006, TV Series) as Mike Werle / Mike / Mr. Bradley
 James Dean (2001, TV Movie) as 'Eden' Makeup Person
 Girlfriends (2003, TV Series) as Dr. Garrett / Dr. Michael Garrett
 Chopping Block (2005) as Joe Rozzi
 My Name Is Earl (2006, TV Series) as Mr. Covington
 Harold (2008) as Principal Nelson
 Artificially Speaking (2009, Short) as Dr. Lionel Bainbridge
 Raising Hope (2010–2014, TV Series) as Attorney Wally Phipps
 The Millers (2013–2014, TV Series) as Mr. Booms
 Honey Jar: Chase for the Gold (2016) as Coach Felton
 Chicanery (2017) as Ben Gitzel

External links 
 Official Site
 

1948 births
American male film actors
American male stage actors
American male television actors
Living people
Male actors from San Jose, California